(German: camouflaged publications) were a way to avoid censorship in Nazi Germany between 1933 and 1945. Illegal writings were given an innocent-looking cover and first and last pages. The Communist Party of Germany published about 80% of the camouflaged publications. An estimated 900–1000 publications were issued with up to 40,000 copies printed per title. Most of the publications were written for Germany, but there were also volumes for Spain and Norway, where a speech by Joseph Stalin was given the title  ("How to protect potatoes from frost").

See also
Underground media in German-occupied Europe
Samizdat

References

 Gittig, Heinz. Bibliographie der Tarnschriften 1933 bis 1945 (Muenchen [etc.] : Saur, 1996)

German resistance to Nazism
Censorship in Germany
Publishing in Germany